Las Fuerzas Armadas de la Resistencia Nacional (National Resistance Armed Forces) was the military arm of National Resistance, a Salvadoran communist organization that was founded on May 10, 1975 when ideological differences within the ERP (Ejército Revolucionario del Pueblo) and the assassinations of Roque Dalton and Armando Arteaga made some members break away from the ERP. Ernesto Jovel was its first general secretary. Other founding members of the RN included Eduardo Sancho (aka Fermán Cienfuegos), Lil Milagro Ramírez, Julia Rodríguez and Arsenio.

See also
 History of El Salvador
 El Salvador Civil War

References

External links
 Website dedicated to the RN

Farabundo Martí National Liberation Front
Guerrilla movements in Latin America
Salvadoran Civil War